William E. Richey (June 1, 1841 – June 21, 1909) was an American soldier who fought for the Union Army during the American Civil War. He received the Medal of Honor for valor.

Biography
Richey received the Medal of Honor in November 9, 1893 for his actions at the Battle of Chickamauga on September 19, 1863 while with Company A of the 15th Ohio Infantry.

Medal of Honor citation

Citation:

The President of the United States of America, in the name of Congress, takes pleasure in presenting the Medal of Honor to Corporal William E. Richey, United States Army, for extraordinary heroism on 19 September 1863, while serving with Company A, 15th Ohio Infantry, in action at Chickamauga, Georgia. While on the extreme front, between the lines of the combatants single-handed Corporal Richey captured a Confederate major who was armed and mounted.

See also

List of American Civil War Medal of Honor recipients: Q–S

References

External links

1841 births
1909 deaths
Union Army soldiers
United States Army Medal of Honor recipients
American Civil War recipients of the Medal of Honor
Military personnel from Ohio
People from Athens County, Ohio